Rosebuds may refer to:

 Adamstown Rosebuds, a football (soccer) club
 Portland Rosebuds (ice hockey), two professional ice hockey teams based in Portland, Oregon during the 20th century
 Portland Rosebuds (baseball), a professional baseball team based in Portland, Oregon in 1946
 The Rosebuds, an indie rock band
 Victoria Rosebuds, a minor league baseball team

See also

 Rosebud (disambiguation)